Tomas Barrientes (born March 10, 1970) is an American professional boxer and is the former IBA Light Welterweight Champion.

Professional career

IBA Light Welterweight Championship
In June 2004, Barrientes upset Emanuel Augustus to win the IBA Light Welterweight title.

Ortiz vs. Barrientes
On April 14, 2007 Tomas was knocked out by title contender Victor Ortíz at the Alamodome in San Antonio, Texas.

References

External links

American boxers of Mexican descent
Welterweight boxers
1970 births
Living people
American male boxers
People from Mercedes, Texas